The Exeter–Plymouth line, also called the South Devon Main Line, is a central part of the trunk railway line between  and  in the southern United Kingdom. It was one of the principal routes of the Great Western Railway which in 1948 became part of the Western Region of British Railways and are now part of the Network Rail system.

History
The various sections of line were opened: 
Exeter to  – 30 May 1846
Teignmouth to Newton – 30 December 1846
 Newton to  – 20 July 1847
 Totnes to  – 5 May 1848
 Laira to Plymouth – 2 April 1849

The entire line between Exeter and Plymouth was built by the South Devon Railway Company.

The nominally independent companies had all been amalgamated into the Great Western Railway by 1 February 1876, and the remaining  broad gauge lines were closed on 20 May 1892 and converted to  standard gauge over the following weekend. A series of cut-off lines were constructed during the following 15 years which saw the through route established. The Great Western was nationalised on 1 January 1948 as part of the new British Railways.

In 1977 the Parliamentary Select Committee on Nationalised Industries recommended considering electrification of more of Britain's rail network, and by 1979 BR presented a range of options to do so by 2000. Some included electrifying the Bristol to Exeter line, Exeter to Plymouth Line, Riviera Line and Cornish Main Line. Under the 1979–90 Conservative governments that succeeded the 1976–79 Labour government the proposal was not implemented. Currently, there are no proposals to electrify the line.

Resignalling in the 1980s allowed faster running. This was followed by privatisation in the 1990s, being transferred first to Railtrack and then to its successor Network Rail. The maximum speed on the line is now .

Route

Exeter to Newton Abbot

Communities served: Exeter – Starcross (and Exmouth via a seasonal ferry service) – Dawlish Warren – Dawlish – Teignmouth – Newton Abbot

On leaving  the line to  climbs away on the left passing the Panel Signal Box by the entrance to the Exeter TMD where local Great Western Railway DMUs are maintained. The old South Devon Railway main line, crosses the River Exe and a parallel flood relief channel, and then passes above the suburbs of Exeter along a stone viaduct on which is situated Exeter St Thomas railway station. On the left a short line went down to the Exeter Canal at City Basin; on the right a longer branch ran to Heathfield on the Newton Abbot to Moretonhampstead branch.

The line crosses marshes as it runs alongside the canal and river, passing the site of Exminster railway station, with a George Hennet station house on the right. A square pond to the left of the line is the site of Turf engine house. This stretch of the line used to have long water troughs between the rails from which steam locomotives could refill their water tanks without stopping.

From Powderham Castle the railway is right alongside the river; on the right of the line is the castle's deer park, while on the left, across the river, trains on the Avocet Line run near . The line now enters the village of Starcross beyond which is the pier for the Exmouth to Starcross Ferry and, on the right, the old Starcross engine house. A little further along the river the railway crosses the mouth of Cockwood harbour. The railway line opens out into four lines at Dawlish Warren railway station, where the platforms are alongside loop lines that allow fast trains to overtake stopping services.

The railway now comes onto the South Devon Railway sea wall which it shares with a footpath. Approaching Dawlish railway station, the Coastguard's Cottage was used by the railway during its construction  and then sold to the coastguard; their boat house is below the footbridge. The footpath along the sea wall now ends and the line enters its first tunnel, the  Kennaway Tunnel beneath Lea Mount, beyond which is Coryton beach and then  Coryton tunnel. The next beach is the private Shell Cove and then the railway passes through  Phillot Tunnel and  Clerk's Tunnel, emerging onto a section of sea wall at Breeches Rock before diving into  Parson's Tunnel beneath Hole Head. The last two tunnels are named after the Parson and Clerk Rocks, two stacks in the sea off Hole Head. When the tunnel was dug the workers cut into a smugglers tunnel which ran from a hidden entrance above the cliff down to a secluded cove. The sea wall is known for its maintenance problems, in particular, all services on the line were suspended after the line collapsed at Dawlish during storms on 5 February 2014, but the line reopened on 4 April 2014 after extensive reconstruction work.

Beyond Parson's Tunnel is a short viaduct across Smugglers Lane and then the footpath resumes alongside the line for the final stretch of the Sea Wall past Sprey Point to the cutting at Teignmouth Eastcliff. On the right side of the railway near Sprey Point can be seen the remains of a lime kiln used during the construction of the line.

The railway passes through to Teignmouth railway station then continues through a cutting to emerge behind the busy Teignmouth Harbour, after which the railway resumes its course alongside the water, now the River Teign. The cuttings on both sides of the station were originally tunnels and were opened out between 1879 and 1884. The railway passes under the long Shaldon Bridge and then follows the river past the small promontories at Flow Point, Red Rock, and Summer House.

After leaving the riverside the line crosses Hackney Marshes and passes between the railway sidings at Hackney Yard (left), and the race course and former Moretonhampstead branch (right). The industrial area to the left of Newton Abbot railway station is the site of the South Devon Railway Company locomotive workshops — the older stone buildings are the only surviving railway buildings.

Newton Abbot to Plymouth

Communities served: Newton Abbot – Totnes – Ivybridge – Plymouth

Just outside Newton Abbot a line branches off on the left but continues to run alongside the main line. The line from Exeter to Plymouth was designed by Isambard Kingdom Brunel as an atmospheric railway which allowed steeper gradients, sharper curves, and lighter structures. Atmospheric trains never ran beyond Newton Abbot but the legacy of the aborted scheme means that line speeds on towards Plymouth are lower than elsewhere on the route.

Once through Dainton Tunnel the line drops down past Littlehempston and shortly the South Devon Railway, a heritage railway, on the right. Behind the right-hand platform can be seen a dairy which is built around the old atmospheric engine house. The line then passes under the concurrent A385 and A381 roads carried on a steel girder bridge.

The steep climb up Rattery Bank starts right from the end of the platform, a stiff challenge in former days to trains that called at Totnes. At the top is Rattery Viaduct and the  Marley Tunnel. The original single-track tunnel had a second bore added alongside it in 1893 when the line was doubled. The line is now running along the southern edge of Dartmoor. Brent railway station was once the junction for the Kingsbridge branch line which joined the route in the cutting just before the station. Curving to the left the line passes over the  Brent Mill Viaduct and then the  Glazebrook Viaduct.

After passing through the  Wrangaton Tunnel the line passes through the remains of Wrangaton railway station; Monksmoor Siding on the right used to serve a naval stores depot. Just beyond the site of Bittaford Platform is the  Bittaford Viaduct. The industrial buildings on the right were built as china clay dries where clay dug on Dartmoor was treated; the Redlake Tramway was built alongside the pipeline that carried the liquid clay.

The line now comes to Ivybridge railway station. The platforms here are staggered with the one on the left nearer Totnes than the one on the right. This is a modern station opened in 1994; the original station was closed in 1965 and was on the far side of the curving  Ivybridge Viaduct where an old goods shed can be seen on the left. After the  Blatchford Viaduct is the old Cornwood railway station where George Hennet's station house is on the right.

 Slade Viaduct brings rises to the top of Hemerdon Bank, the steepest climb for trains heading towards Newton Abbot. A fast run down the bank to the site of Plympton railway station, and then Tavistock Junction. The large goods yard here includes a maintenance shed for on-track equipment and a connection to the china clay drier at Marsh Mills. This is on the former South Devon and Tavistock Railway although the junction originally faced Plymouth.

The line swings left under the Marsh Mills Viaduct of the A38 road and then runs alongside the tidal estuary of the River Plym on the left, with the grounds of Saltram House at Plymstock on the far bank. Underneath the Embankment Road bridge which carries the A38 over the line again and Laira TMD on the left. Laira maintains Great Western Railway's High Speed Trains in Devon. A triangle of lines takes a freight route down to the Plymouth waterfront via the closed Plymouth Friary railway station, which was the terminus for trains on the competing route from London Waterloo station.

Current services
Most of services on the route are operated by Great Western Railway. Some of these services travel through Reading and Bristol, and join at Taunton, before continuing to Exeter on the Bristol to Exeter line. The operator also provides local services along the full length of the line.

CrossCountry services operate along the entire line.

Infrastructure
The route is double track throughout with passing loops at certain locations. The route has a loading gauge clearance of W7, and is open to rolling stock up to Route Availability 8. Signalling requires four minutes between trains on most of the route, but 6 minutes west of Newton Abbot. Signalling is by multiple-aspect signals, controlled from panel signal boxes at Exeter and Plymouth. Most of the signals are three-aspect, but some sections of two- or four-aspect signalling also exist.

Accidents
There has been a number of serious accidents on the line over the years. Some of the notable ones are:

  – collision, 22 September 1921.
 Sea Wall – landslip, 16 February 1855 and various other dates including 5 February 2014. (See South Devon Railway sea wall for full list)
  – collision, 31 October 1853.
 Totnes – boiler explosion, 13 March 1860.
 Totnes – derailment, 5 April 1865.
 Rattery near Totnes – collision, 1 August 1853.
  – collision, 29 July 1862.
  – boiler explosion, 27 June 1849.
 Plympton – collision, 13 September 1866.
  – buffer stop collision, 13 September 1866.

See also
Disused railway stations (Exeter to Plymouth Line)
Exeter to Plymouth railway of the LSWR

References

Sources and further reading

Railway lines in South East England
Rail transport in Devon
Transport in Exeter
Railway lines opened in 1906
Railway lines in South West England
1906 establishments in England